The following is a list of FCC-licensed AM and FM radio stations in the U.S. state of Texas, which can be sorted by their call signs, broadcast frequencies, cities of license, licensees, or programming formats.

List of radio stations

Defunct
 KBAL-FM
 KCER-LP
 KERB-FM
 KJNZ
 KJOJ-FM
 KLBW
 KMUL
 KM2XVL
 KNSH
 KOGT
 KOTY
 KOZA
 KPHS
 KPRO
 KQTY
 KRHC
 KRMY
 KSTB
 KULF
 KXAL-LP
 KXGC-FM
 KZSP

See also

 Texas media
 List of newspapers in Texas
 List of television stations in Texas
 Media of cities in Texas: Abilene, Amarillo, Austin, Beaumont, Brownsville, Dallas, Denton, El Paso, Fort Worth, Houston, Killeen, Laredo, Lubbock, McAllen, McKinney, Midland, Odessa, San Antonio, Waco, Wichita Falls
 Texas DX Society (ham radio)

References

Bibliography

External links

 www.radiomap.us – List of radio stations in Dallas, Texas
 www.radiomap.us – List of radio stations in Houston, Texas
  (Directory ceased in 2017)
 Texas Association of Broadcasters
 Houston Vintage Radio Association (est. 1978)

Images

 
Texas
radio